William H. Chapman Nyaho (surname Chapman Nyaho; b. Washington, D.C., 1958) is a Ghanaian American concert pianist specializing in solo piano music by composers from Africa and the African diaspora.

He graduated from the Achimota School in Achimota, where he studied piano with John Barham. He holds B.A. and M.A. degrees in music from St Peter's College, Oxford University, an M.M. from the Eastman School of Music, and a D.M.A. from the University of Texas at Austin. He has also studied at the Conservatoire de Musique de Genève. He has taught at the University of Louisiana at Lafayette, Colby College and Pomona College, Willamette University. He is currently on the faculty of Pacific Lutheran University and the Interlochen Arts Academy Summer Camp. He also teaches privately and performs nationally and internationally giving recitals, masterclasses and workshops.

His repertoire includes music by Gamal Abdel-Rahim, Margaret Bonds, Samuel Coleridge-Taylor, Robert Nathaniel Dett, Halim El-Dabh, Coleridge-Taylor Perkinson, Gyimah Labi, and Joshua Uzoigwe. He has performed throughout the U.S., Canada, and Europe, as well as in China.

He has compiled and edited a five-volume anthology Piano Music of Africa and the African Diaspora published by Oxford University Press.

He lives in Seattle, Washington.

Recordings
Senku: Piano Music by Composers of African Descent (MSR Classics)
ASA: Piano Music by Composers of African Descent (MSR Classics)
"Aaron Copland: Music for Two Pianos" Nyaho/Garcia Duo  (Centaur Records)
 ‘Kete: Piano Music of Africa and the African Diaspora’
(MSR Classics)
 ‘Five by Four’ 
Nyaho/Garcia Duo
(MSR Classics)

References
 Biography on American Voices website
 Preview (with profile) of an event at the Hornby Festival in Spring 2010
 Profile on WNYC website

External links
 Official site
 Nyaho page
 review by WNYC
 Review by musicweb-international of ASA - Piano music by composers of African descent

1958 births
Living people
Musicians from Washington, D.C.
African-American classical pianists
American classical pianists
Male classical pianists
American male pianists
African-American classical musicians
American people of Ghanaian descent
Eastman School of Music alumni
Musicians from Seattle
Alumni of Achimota School
Alumni of St Peter's College, Oxford
University of Texas at Austin College of Fine Arts alumni
Musicians from Accra
University of Louisiana at Lafayette faculty
20th-century American pianists
21st-century classical pianists
20th-century American male musicians
21st-century American male musicians
21st-century American pianists
20th-century African-American musicians
21st-century African-American musicians